Marinus Larsen (born November 15, 1849) was a Latter-day Saint religious leader and a member of the first Utah state legislature, representing the 11th district.

Early life and career
Larsen was born in Hurup, Als parish, Aalborg Municipality, Denmark. He converted to the Church of Jesus Christ of Latter-day Saints (LDS Church) in 1862. That same year he emigrated to the United States, settling in Spanish Fork, Utah Territory in September. He remained there for the rest of his life.

In 1891, when the one LDS Church ward in Spanish Fork was divided into four, Larsen was made bishop of the Spanish Fork 3rd Ward. He served in that position until 1903.

Larsen served for two terms as mayor of Spanish Fork. He also served on the city council for four terms. He was a member of the Utah House of Representatives for two terms.

Sources
Andrew Jenson, Encyclopedia History of the Church of Jesus Christ of Latter-day Saints, p. 825.
Andrew Jenson, Latter Day Saint Biographical Encyclopedia, vol. 3, p. 138-139.
https://utahstatehistory.omeka.net/exhibits/show/comingtogetherutah/governingstateofutah/representatives

References

1849 births
Converts to Mormonism
Danish leaders of the Church of Jesus Christ of Latter-day Saints
Danish emigrants to the United States
Members of the Utah House of Representatives
Mayors of places in Utah
People from Spanish Fork, Utah
Year of death missing